Charles R. Tanner (February 17, 1896 – 9 January 1974) was an American science fiction and fantasy author who wrote in the late 1930s and early 1940s.  Tanner's first short story was "The Color of Space", published in Science Wonder Stories in 1930. Within a few years, he created his character Tumithak, who featured in three stories published during Tanner's lifetime ("Tumithak of the Corridors", "Tumithak in Shawm", and "Tumithak and the Towers of Fire") and a fourth, "Tumithak and the Ancient Word", published posthumously in 2005.

During the Great Depression, one of Tanner's three children died, while his wife suffered an extended hospitalization for tuberculosis.

Bibliography

"The Color of Space" (1930)
"The Flight of the Mercury" (1930)
"Tumithak of the Corridors" (1932)
"Tumithak in Shawm" (1933)
"The Vanishing Diamonds" (1938)
"Out of the Jar" (1941)
"The Stillwell Degravitator" (1941)
"The Improbable" (1941)
"Tumithak of the Towers of Fire" (1941)
"Cham of the Hills" (1942)
"The Luck of Enoch Higgins" (1942)
"The Revolt of the Machine Men" (1942)
"Mutiny in the Void" (1943)
"Mr. Garfinkel and the Lepra-Cohen" (1950)
"Johnny Goodturn" (1950)
"Angus MacAuliffe and the Gowden Tooch" (1951)
"Tumithak and the Ancient Word" (2005)

References

External links
All of Tanner's stories at Tumithak.com
Biography: "The Writings of Charles R. Tanner"

1896 births
1974 deaths
American fantasy writers
American horror writers
American science fiction writers
American male poets
American male novelists
American male short story writers
20th-century American poets
20th-century American novelists
20th-century American short story writers
20th-century American male writers